Walhaz is a reconstructed Proto-Germanic word meaning 'foreigner', or more specifically 'Roman', 'Romance-speaker' or '(romanized) Celt', and survives in English as 'Welsh'. The term was used by the ancient Germanic peoples to describe inhabitants of the former Roman Empire, who were largely romanised and spoke Latin languages (cf. Valland in Old Norse). The forms of these words imply that they are descended from a Proto-Germanic form *walhiska-.

From *Walhaz to welsch
The Volcae tribe occupied territory neighbouring that of the Germanic people and seem to have been referred to by the proto-Germanic name  (plural , adjectival form ). It is assumed that this term specifically referred to the Volcae, because application of Grimm's law to that word produces the form . Subsequently, this term  was applied rather indiscriminately to the southern neighbours of the Germanic people, as evidenced in geographic names such as Walchgau and Walchensee in Bavaria. Place names containing the element *walbaz denote communities or enclaves in the Germanic-speaking world where Romance was spoken, such as Waalwijk in North Brabant, Netherlands and Walcbensee in Bavaria, Germany.

From *Walhaz to Vlach

In Old English, *:walbaz developed into wealh, retaining the inherited meaning ‘a foreigner, more particularly a pre-Anglo-Saxon inhabitant of Britain who spoke Celtic or Latin or both’. It also came to imply the 'social position of the British natives that in the West Saxon dialect of Old English' and came to mean ‘(British) slave’. The old feminine derivative of *walhaz, Old English wiln < *wielen < * wealh-in-, even exclusively means ‘a female slave’ and is likewise concentrated in the Saxon south of England.

From the Slavs the term passed to other peoples, such as the Hungarians (referring to Vlachs, more specifically Romanians, referring to Italians), Turks and Byzantines and was used for all Latin people of the Balkans.

Notable people
 Jeremiah of Wallachia (Italian: Geremia da Valacchia) (Jon Stoika, 1556–1625), Capuchin priest, b. in Tzazo, Moldavia ("Vallachia Minor" or "Piccola Valacchia", i.e. Small Wallachia) Romania, beatified in 1983
 Nicolaus Olahus (Latin for Nicholas, the Vlach; Hungarian: Oláh Miklós, Romanian: Nicolae Valahul)  (1493–1568), Archbishop of Esztergom
 Marie Countess Walewska (née Łączyńska; Polish: Maria Walewska; 7 December 1786 – 11 December 1817) was a Polish noblewoman and a mistress of Emperor Napoleon I

See also

 Vlachs, also known as Wallachs 
 Theodiscus
 Names of the Celts

References

Ethnonyms
Germanic words and phrases
Germania
Ancient Roman culture
Wallonia
History of Wales
Wallachia
Reconstructed words